Éamonn Morrissey (born 1949 ) is an Irish retired sportsperson. Born in Kilkeny, Ireland, he played hurling with his local club James Stephens and was a member of the Kilkenny senior inter-county team from 1972 until 1973.

References

1949 births
Living people
James Stephens hurlers
Kilkenny inter-county hurlers
People from Kilkenny (city)